is a lighthouse on Kinkasan, an island off the Oshika Peninsula in Ishinomaki, Miyagi, Japan.

The Kinkasan Lighthouse was one of 26 lighthouses designed and built in Meiji period Japan by the British engineer Richard Henry Brunton. It was completed and lit on November 1, 1876, eight months after Brunton left Japan.

The lighthouse was destroyed from July to August 1945 by the United States Navy during World War II, but was rebuilt in February 1946. It was completely automated on April 1, 2005.

See also

 List of lighthouses in Japan

References

Brunton, Richard. Building Japan, 1868-1879. Japan Library, 1991. 
Pedlar, Neil. The Imported Pioneers: Westerners who Helped Build Modern Japan. Routledge, 1990. 
Brunton, Richard H. "THE JAPAN LIGHTS (INCLUDING APPENDIX AND PLATES AT BACK OF VOLUME)." Minutes of the Proceedings [of the Institution of Civil Engineers] 47.1877 (1876): 11. ICE Virtual Library. Web. 8 May 2011. <http://www.icevirtuallibrary.com/content/article/10.1680/imotp.1877.22547>.

External links
 Lighthouses in Japan 
Historic Lighthouses of Japan

Lighthouses completed in 1876
Buildings and structures in Miyagi Prefecture
Lighthouses in Japan
Ishinomaki
1876 establishments in Japan